Mondelez Kinh Do is part of Mondelēz International, Inc, located in Chicago, Illinois (US). It is a global snacking powerhouse that aims to lead the future of snacking industry with iconic global and local brands such as Cosy biscuits, Kinh Do mooncakes, Solite cakes, Slide potato chips, AFC crackers, OREO cookies, RITZ crackers, LU biscuits, Toblerone chocolate, Cadbury Dairy Milk chocolate, Tang powdered beverage, Halls candy, Trident gum and many more. In Vietnam, it operates in three locations in Ho Chi Minh City, two plants in Binh Duong and Hung Yen, Vietnam, with more than 3,000 employees.

Company History 
Mondelez Kinh Do Vietnam was established in 2015 after Mondelēz International, Inc. bought Kinh Do Corporation. Mondelēz Kinh Do is now a member of global snacking powerhouse- Mondelez International and the only US company in the confectionery market in Vietnam to supply all types of biscuits, fresh bread, sponge cakes, mooncakes, chocolates, and other confectionery.

History 
In 1993: Kinh Do Construction and Food Processing Company Limited was founded.

In 1996: Commenced Construction of factory at 6/134 National Highway 13, Hiep Binh Phuoc Ward, Thu Duc District, Ho Chi Minh City. At the same time, the company also invested in a cookie production line with modern Danish technology and equipment worth USD 5 million.

In 1997-1998, continued investing in a production line for bread and sponge cake with a total investment value of over $1.2 million.

At the end of 1998, the Chocolate candy production line was put into operation with a total investment of about $800,000.

In 2000, the Company increased investment capital to vnd 51 billion, and expanded the factory to nearly 60,000 m2, of which the factory area was 40,000 m². To diversify products, the company invested in a Cracker production line from Europe worth over $2 million.

In April 2001, the Company invested in a new hard candy production line and a modern fondant production line with a total value of USD 2 million, with a capacity of 40 tons/day to meet the needs of the market domestically and internationally.

By June 2001, the company's total investment capital was up to $30 million. The company put into operation one more Cracker production line with a value of $3 million and a capacity of 1.5 tons/hour. Kinh Do factory in Hung Yen was also put into operation to serve the market in Hanoi and the northern provinces.

In 2001, the company promoted exports to the US, France, Canada, Germany, Taiwan, Singapore, Cambodia, Laos, Japan, Malaysia, Thailand.

In 2002, the company's products and production lines were certified by BVQI to ISO 9002 and later to ISO 9002:2000. Raising charter capital to 150 billion VND, the company started to enter the moon cake market and changed its name to Kinh Do Corporation.

In 2015, Mondelēz International acquired Kinh Do's confectionery business and changed its name to Mondelez Kinh Do Vietnam Joint Stock Company. Mondelez Kinh Do is currently a member of the global Mondelēz International group, head quartered in Chicago, Illinois (USA).

Products 
Biscuits: Cosy, AFC, Oreo, LU, Ritz; Kinh Do Mooncake; Kinh Do fresh; Solite; Slide; Toblerone; Cadbury; Tang; Halls; Trident.

Head office and plants 

In Vietnam, we are now operating in three locations with more than 3,000 employees: the representative office in Ho Chi Minh City, two plants in Binh Duong and Hung Yen, Vietnam.

External links 
 
 https://www.mondelezinternational.com/

Companies listed on the Ho Chi Minh City Stock Exchange
Manufacturing companies based in Ho Chi Minh City
Bakeries of Vietnam
Vietnamese companies established in 1993
Food and drink companies established in 1993